Patricia Anne Maloney (born March 17, 1936) is an American actress.

Early life
She was born in Perkinsville, New York. She stands  and weighs .

Career 
Maloney is best known as Honk from Far Out Space Nuts, as Lumpy from the Star Wars Holiday Special, and as Darla Hood from the animated TV series version of The Little Rascals. She appeared in Star Trek: Voyager in 1996.

She was often a guest on the 1970s variety series Donny & Marie, and portrayed the robot waitress Tina in the Buck Rogers in the 25th Century episode "Cruise Ship to the Stars".
In 1977 she appeared in the episode "Ida Works Out" on Rhoda as a witch on Halloween looking for a costume party in Rhoda's apartment building.

Since 1982, she has also been an animation voice actor, worked on the Monopoly game show pilot, and even operated the Crypt Keeper puppet on Tales from the Crypt. Maloney appeared in Ernest Saves Christmas with California native Buddy Douglas as Santa's two elves. In 2011, she appeared as herself in Hanlet: Episode 4 – Attack of the Phantom Special, an independent documentary film about the making of Star Wars Holiday Special.

Another of her voice roles was in 1988, alongside Jeff Cohen, Glynis Johns and Casey Kasem in the movie Scooby-Doo and the Ghoul School as Tanis the Mummy.

Personal life
In 1961, Maloney married Joseph Vitek, a Chicago printer, at the Actors' Chapel in New York. During their marriage, she worked as a keypunch operator at Clipper Carloading in Chicago until Vitek died in 1968. Around 2010, she was diagnosed with age-related macular degeneration, a visual impairment which severely limited her ability to read scripts and other textual matter.

Filmography

Film

Television

References

External links

 
 Star Wars Holiday Special site 
 Short Persons Support page

1936 births
Living people
Actors with dwarfism
American film actresses
American television actresses
Actresses from New York (state)
Actresses from Orlando, Florida
University of Florida alumni
People from Winter Park, Florida
People from Steuben County, New York
20th-century American actresses
21st-century American women